A referendum on adopting a new constitution before the elections was held in the Socialist Republic of Serbia on 2 July 1990. Following the approval of the proposal by 97.25% of voters, the Serbian parliament promulgated a new constitution on 28 September. Elections were subsequently held on 9 December.

Results

References

1990 in Serbia
1990 in Yugoslavia
1990 referendums
Referendums in Serbia
Referendums in Yugoslavia
Constitutional referendums
July 1990 events in Europe